Frank Farmer Loomis Jr. (August 22, 1896 – April 4, 1971) was an American athlete, winner of 400 m hurdles at the 1920 Summer Olympics in Antwerp. His brother, Jo Gilbert Loomis, was a substitute sprinter at the same Olympics.

Loomis went to school in Evanston until 1914. Upon meeting his future Oregon High School teammate Sherman Landers, he transferred to Oregon, Illinois, to continue training with him. Together, they began a rise that would take them to the 1920 Olympic Games. Although Loomis was an AAU champion in  hurdles in 1917 and 1918 and in  hurdles in 1920, the main favorite in Antwerp was John Norton, who had run a new world record of 54.2 just two months before the Olympics. Despite that, Loomis won the 400 m hurdles final easily in a new world record of 54.0, beating Norton to second place by 0.6 seconds.

Landers-Loomis Field in Oregon, Illinois, is named partially in his honor.

References

1896 births
1971 deaths
American male hurdlers
Hastings Broncos football coaches
Athletes (track and field) at the 1920 Summer Olympics
World record setters in athletics (track and field)
Olympic gold medalists for the United States in track and field
Medalists at the 1920 Summer Olympics
People from Oregon, Illinois
Track and field athletes from Illinois